Glycine-N-acyltransferase, also known as GLYAT, is an enzyme which in humans is encoded by the GLYAT gene.

Function 

The glycine-N-acyltransferase protein conjugates glycine with acyl-CoA substrates in the mitochondria primarily in liver and kidney. The glycine N-acyltransferase enzyme is involved in the detoxification of a wide range of xenobiotic and endogenous metabolites. These include benzoic acid, a compound found in fruits and vegetables and used in medicine and foodstuffs as a preservative; salicylic acid, a metabolite of aspirin; and several endogenous metabolites. The diversity is demonstrated by the wide range of acylglycines excreted in the urines of patients with defects of organic acid metabolism. No defect of glycine N-acyltransferase has yet been described, but it has been demonstrated that there is significant inter individual variation in glycine conjugation capacity. Human glycine N-acyltransferase isoform a is a 296 amino acid protein translated from mRNA transcript splice variant 1. It is encoded by exons 2 to 6 of the mRNA transcript.

Molecular weight 

The literature reports it to be approximately 30 kDa, or approximately 27 kDa. The predicted size is 33.9 KDa. For the bovine enzyme a range of sizes between approximately 33 kDa and about 36 KDa is reported (Nandi, 1979, Vessey, 1992, van der Westhuizen, 2000). The predicted size of bovine GLYAT based on its sequence (accession number nm: 177486), is 33.9 kDa. This compares well to the experimentally determined sizes

References

Further reading

External links